M51 or M-51 may refer to:

 M-51 (Michigan highway), a state highway in Michigan
 M51 highway (Russia)
 M51 (Cape Town), a Metropolitan Route in Cape Town, South Africa
 M51 Skysweeper, an anti-aircraft gun
 M51 MACI mine
 M51 SLBM, a French nuclear ballistic missile
 BMW M51, a 1991 straight-6 Diesel engine 
 Sherman M-51, an Israeli modification of American M4 Sherman tank
 Eidgenössischer Stutzer 1851, a historical service rifle of the Swiss Army
 Messier 51, a spiral galaxy also known as the Whirlpool Galaxy
 Samsung Galaxy M51, a smartphone released in 2020